Jaheim Anthony Headley (born 24 September 2001) is an English professional footballer who plays for as a left-back for Championship club Huddersfield Town.

Club career
Born in Southwark, London, Headley started out at Millwall, then trained at the Mass Elite Academy, before he moved to Huddersfield Town's under-17 squad in 2017.

Headley moved on loan to Bradford (Park Avenue) in 2019, then Hyde United in 2020.

In the 2020–21 season, Headley alongside Terriers teammate Mustapha Olagunju joined National League South side Welling United on a 3 month loan deal.

In the 2021–22 season, Headley joined National League side Yeovil Town on a 1 month loan deal, but only made one appearance in the FA Trophy.

On 21 June 2022, Headley, alongside Terriers teammate Josh Austerfield joined EFL League Two side Harrogate Town on loan for the 2022–23 season. He made his league debut in the 3–0 win over Swindon Town on 30 July, then scored his first goal in the 2–1 defeat to Bradford City. He was recalled by his parent club in January 2023.

International career
Although he hasn't made any international appearances of any kind, Headley could represent England, Jamaica or the United States through his heritage.

Career statistics

References

External links

2001 births
Living people
English footballers
Footballers from Southwark
Association football midfielders
Huddersfield Town A.F.C. players
Bradford (Park Avenue) A.F.C. players
Hyde United F.C. players
Welling United F.C. players
Yeovil Town F.C. players
Harrogate Town A.F.C. players
English Football League players
National League (English football) players
Northern Premier League players